Nelson Mandela Metropolitan Art Museum was opened on 22 June 1956 as the King George VI Art Gallery. It is located in St George's Park in Port Elizabeth, South Africa. It was renamed in December 2002 in honour of Nelson Mandela and in line with the name of the Nelson Mandela Bay Metropolitan Municipality, of which Port Elizabeth is a part.

Venue and collections
The Art Museum consists of two buildings defining the entrance to St George's Park which houses collections of South African art, with an emphasis on art of and from the Eastern Cape, as well as British art. There are also international printmaking and Oriental art, which include Indian miniatures and Chinese textiles. At the same time exhibiting the Permanent Collection on rotation – given the gallery's limited space – the museum maintains an active programme of temporary exhibitions of works travelling between the major art museums of South Africa.

References

External links
Nelson Mandela Metropolitan Art Museum Official Website
Nelson Mandela Metropolitan Art Museum

Art museums established in 1956
Museums in the Eastern Cape
Art museums and galleries in South Africa
Buildings and structures in Port Elizabeth
1956 establishments in South Africa